Inglewood Unified School District abbreviated (IUSD)  is a public school system district headquartered in Inglewood, California (USA)

IUSD serves most of the city of Inglewood and much of the unincorporated Los Angeles County community of Ladera Heights. A small section of View Park-Windsor Hills and a small section of Los Angeles are in the district boundaries.

History
When the Inglewood Union High School District, now known as the Centinela Valley Union High School District (CVUHSD), formed in 1905, the Inglewood elementary school district was within its territory. The name of the high school district changed to its current name on November 1, 1944. On July 1, 1954, the Inglewood elementary school district withdrew from CVUSD and became a unified school district that also operated high schools.

Schools

Adult schools
 Inglewood Community Adult School

Continuation schools
 Hillcrest Continuation High School

High schools
Zoned
 Inglewood High School
 Morningside High School
Alternative
 City Honors High School

K-8 schools
 La Tijera K-8 School
 Warren Lane K-8 School
 Frank D. Parent K-8 School

Middle schools
6-8
 Albert F. Monroe Middle School
7-8
 George W. Crozier Middle School

Primary schools
K-6
 Centinela Elementary School
 Daniel Freeman Elementary School
 Beulah Payne Elementary School
K-5
 Bennett-Kew Elementary School
 Highland Elementary School
 W. Claude Hudnall Elementary School
 William H. Kelso Elementary School
 Oak Street Elementary School
 Clyde Woodworth Elementary School
 Worthington Elementary School

References

Further reading
  - Chronicles four schools in Inglewood USD, beginning on page 9

External links

 Inglewood Unified School District site

School districts in Los Angeles County, California
Education in Inglewood, California
Education in Los Angeles
School districts established in 1954
1954 establishments in California